"This Love" is a song by English rock band Bad Company. The song was released as the lead single from the band's seventh studio album Fame and Fortune, the group's first single since reforming earlier that year with ex-Ted Nugent vocalist Brian Howe.

Music video
A music video was created for the song, showing the band performing the song on a stage.

Track listing
7" single

12" single

Charts

Personnel
 Brian Howe – lead vocals, saxophone
 Mick Ralphs – guitar, keyboard, backing vocals
 Steve Price – bass
 Simon Kirke – drums

References

Bad Company songs
1986 singles
1986 songs
Atlantic Records singles
Songs written by Brian Howe (singer)